Mornings in Jenin, (2010, U.S.; originally published as The Scar of David, 2006, United States and Les Matins de Jenin, France) is a novel by author Susan Abulhawa.

Background
Mornings in Jenin was originally published in the United States in 2006 as The Scar of David. The novel was translated into French and published as Les Matins de Jenin. It was then translated into 27 languages. Bloomsbury Publishing reissued the novel in the United States as Mornings in Jenin (February, 2010) after slight editing.

Mornings in Jenin is the first mainstream novel in English to explore life in post-1948 Palestine. The novel was partially inspired by the Ghassan Kanafani novel Return to Haifa.

Critical reception

Reviews
Anjali Joseph of The Independent writes that "Susan Abulhawa's novel, first published in the US in 2006 but since reworked, follows the Abulheja family, Yehya and Basima and their two sons, in Ein Hod, a village in Palestine. The pastoral opening crams into 40 pages a cross-faith friendship, a love story (both brothers fall for Dalia, who marries the elder son, Hasan), a death, the Zionist invasion of the village, and the theft of one of Hasan and Dalia's sons, the infant Ismael, by an Israeli soldier. He gives the child to his wife, a Polish Holocaust survivor. Usefully for narrative purposes, the baby, renamed David, has a scar on his face "that would eventually lead him to his truth". From these beginnings, which promise a Middle Eastern Catherine Cookson's story, a fine novel emerges."

Abdullah Khan of The Hindu comments that what struck him most is the honesty of the author’s voice. Despite being born to Palestinian refugees of the Six Day War of 1967, she has tried hard not to let her personal feelings fill the text. All individual Jewish characters are portrayed in sympathetic light. Nowhere in the story has she lost the touch of humanity. Another bright aspect of Susan’s writing is her ornamental use of language in the tradition of contemporary Arabic writing."

Robin Yassin-Kassab of The Sunday Times suggests that at "times you want to criticise Abulhawa for laying the tragedy on too thick, but her raw material is historical fact and her blend of fiction and documentary is one of the book’s strengths. What rescues Mornings in Jenin from polemic is its refusal to wallow or to stoop to tribalism. One of its many achievements is that, for such a necessarily political work, no character becomes a mere cipher for suffering or victimhood. Although the novel is written according to Anglo-American conventions, it echoes the poetic prose that is a feature of contemporary Arabic writing. Abulhawa effectively communicates her bubbling joy in what she calls 'the dance' of Arabic, pondering the language’s intricate courtesies and imagistic flair."

Controversies
In 2007, a live reading of The Scar of David was later reduced to only a book signing by the Barnes & Noble store in Bayside, New York. Barnes and Noble stated that the change was made due to “author safety and a seeming need of sensitivity to the Jewish community”.

Notes

External links
Book review and plot summary - Kirkus Reviews
Interview With Susan Abulhawa

2010 American novels
Palestinian literature
Israeli–Palestinian conflict books
Books about Palestinians
2006 American novels
Bloomsbury Publishing books